Roberto Serrano (born ) is a Mexican male  track cyclist. He competed at the 2014 UCI Track Cycling World Championships.

References

External links
 Profile at cyclingarchives.com

1986 births
Living people
Mexican track cyclists
Mexican male cyclists
Place of birth missing (living people)
Competitors at the 2014 Central American and Caribbean Games